Chthonerpeton is a genus of semiaquatic amphibians in the family Typhlonectidae. They occur in South America east of the Andes.

Species
Chthonerpeton contains the following species:
 Chthonerpeton arii Cascon and Lima-Verde, 1994
 Chthonerpeton braestrupi Taylor, 1968
 Chthonerpeton exile Nussbaum and Wilkinson, 1987
 Chthonerpeton indistinctum (Reinhardt and Lütken, 1862)
 Chthonerpeton noctinectes Silva, Britto-Pereira, and Caramaschi, 2003
 Chthonerpeton onorei Nussbaum, 1986
 Chthonerpeton perissodus Nussbaum and Wilkinson, 1987
 Chthonerpeton tremembe Maciel, Leite, Silva-Leite, Leite, and Cascon, 2015
 Chthonerpeton viviparum Parker and Wettstein, 1929

References

 
Amphibian genera
Amphibians of South America
Taxa named by Wilhelm Peters
Taxonomy articles created by Polbot